Alexander Roche may refer to:

 Alexander Roche, Baron Roche (1871–1956), British barrister and law lord
 Alexander Ignatius Roche (1861–1921), Scottish artist